Gaotu Techedu Inc. (formerly GSX Techedu Inc., from , Genshuixue) is a Chinese education technology company offering online tutoring services for K-12 students, along with foreign language and professional training courses for adults. The company was founded in 2014 by Xiang Dong Chen. Its primary product is the online education platform Genshuixue.

GSX is currently under investigation by the U.S. Securities and Exchange Commission after more than a dozen research reports came out in 2020 accusing GSX of inflating its revenue numbers. These critical reports included ones from short-selling firms such as Muddy Waters Research. The stock price went from a high of $149.05 on January 27, 2021, to a low of $2.40 .

References 

Companies based in Beijing
Companies listed on the New York Stock Exchange